The 2012–13 Perth Heat season will be the third season for the team. The Heat will once again compete in the Australian Baseball League (ABL) with the other five foundation teams, and will again play its home games at Barbagallo Ballpark.

The Heat will also be defending the ABL Championship title, having won the previous season's Championship Series, and over the course of the season, will represent Australia in the 2012 Asia Series.

Offseason 
In 2012, for the second consecutive year, the Heat will represent Australia in the Asia Series, a round-robin tournament of champion teams from the baseball leagues of Asia, including representatives of Japan, Republic of Korea, Republic of China and, going forward, People's Republic of China. The Heat qualified as winners of the 2012 ABL Championship Series. To date, the Heat is the only team to represent Australia in the Asia Series.

Regular season

Standings

Record vs opponents

Game log 

|- bgcolor=#bbffbb
| 1
| 1 November
| @ 
| 9–3
| V. Vasquez
| Z. Fuesser
| 
| 874
| 1-0
| 
|- bgcolor=#bbffbb
| 2
| 2 November
| @ 
| 13–3
| A. Claggett
| P. Mildren
| 
| 1,454
| 2-0
| 
|- bgcolor=#bbffbb
| 3
| 3 November
| @ 
| 8–4
| D. Schmidt
| R. Olson
| 
| 1,578
| 3-0
| 
|- bgcolor=#bbffbb
| 4
| 16 November
| 
| 3–0
| V. Vasquez
| K. Reese
|
| 1,507
| 4-0
| 
|- bgcolor=#bbffbb
| 5
| 17 November
| 
| 9–4
| A. Claggett
| H. Koishi
| 
| 1,619
| 5-0
| 
|- bgcolor=#ffbbbb
| 6
| 18 November
| 
| 2–12
| S. Gibbons
| S. Mitchinson
| 
| 1,189
| 5-1
|  
|- bgcolor=#ffbbbb
| 7
| 22 November
| @ 
| 0–1
| M. Williams
| B. Wise
| 
| 845
| 5-2
| 
|- bgcolor=#ffbbbb
| 8
| 23 November
| @ 
| 2–4
| T. Atherton
| A. Claggett
| M. Williams
| 1,065
| 5-3
| 
|- bgcolor=#bbffbb
| 9
| 24 November
| @ 
| 6–4
| S. Mitchinson
| V. Harris
| C. Lamb
| 1,609
| 6-3
| 
|- bgcolor=#bbffbb
| 10
| 25 November
| @ 
| 4–3
| D. Schmidt
| T. Cox
| B. Wise
| 1,202
| 7-3
| 
|- bgcolor=#bbffbb
| 11
| 30 November
| @ 
| 9-2
| V. Vasquez
| K. Reese
| 
| 584
| 8-3
| 
|-
| 
|-

|- bgcolor=#ffbbbb
| 12
| 1 December (DH 1)
| @ 
| 1–3
| H. Koishi
| S. Mitchinson
| J. Hussey
| 
| 8-4
| 
|- bgcolor=#bbffbb
| 13
| 1 December (DH 2)
| @ 
| 8–0
| A. Claggett
| S. Gibbons
| 
| 1,135
| 9-4
| 
|- bgcolor=#bbffbb
| 14
| 2 December
| @ 
| 4–3
| D. Schmidt
| A. Blackley
| C. Lamb
| 407
| 10-4
| 
|- bgcolor=#ffbbbb
| 15
| 7 December
| 
| 4–6
| C. Lofgren
| V. Vasquez
| R. Searle
| 1,303
| 10-5
| 
|- bgcolor=#bbffbb
| 16
| 8 December (DH 1)
| 
| 3–2
| S. Mitchinson
| C. Smith
| C. Lamb
| 
| 11-5
| 
|- bgcolor=#bbffbb
| 17
| 8 December (DH 2)
| 
| 4–3
| M. Zachary
| J. Erasmus
| W. Saupold
| 1,748
| 12-5
| 
|- bgcolor=#ffbbbb
| 18
| 9 December
| 
| 1–5
| J. Kilby
| D. Schmidt
| 
| 1,359
| 12-6
| 
|-
| 19
| 13 December
| 
| –
| 
| 
| 
| 
| 
| 
|-
| 20
| 14 December (DH 1)
| 
| –
| 
| 
| 
| 
| 
| 
|-
| 21
| 14 December (DH 2)
| 
| –
| 
| 
| 
| 
| 
| 
|-
| 22
| 15 December
| 
| –
| 
| 
| 
| 
| 
| 
|-
| 23
| 21 December
| @ 
| –
| 
| 
| 
| 
| 
| 
|-
| 24
| 22 December (DH 1)
| @ 
| –
| 
| 
| 
| 
| 
| 
|-
| 25
| 22 December (DH 2)
| @ 
| –
| 
| 
| 
| 
| 
| 
|-
| 26
| 23 December
| @ 
| –
| 
| 
| 
| 
| 
| 
|-
| 27
| 28 December
| 
| –
| 
| 
| 
| 
| 
| 
|-
| 28
| 29 December
| 
| –
| 
| 
| 
| 
| 
| 
|-
| 29
| 30 December
| 
| –
| 
| 
| 
| 
| 
| 
|-
| 30
| 31 December
| 
| –
| 
| 
| 
| 
| 
| 
|-

|-
| 31
| 3 January
| @ 
| –
| 
| 
| 
| 
| 
| 
|-
| 32
| 4 January
| @ 
| –
| 
| 
| 
| 
| 
| 
|-
| 33
| 5 January
| @
| –
| 
| 
| 
| 
| 
| 
|-
| 34
| 6 January
| @ 
| –
| 
| 
| 
| 
| 
| 
|-
| 35
| 10 January
| 
| –
| 
| 
| 
| 
| 
| 
|-
| 36
| 11 January
| 
| –
| 
| 
| 
| 
| 
| 
|-
| 37
| 12 January
| 
| –
| 
| 
| 
| 
| 
| 
|-
| 38
| 13 January
| 
| –
| 
| 
| 
| 
| 
| 
|-
| 39
| 18 January
| @ 
| –
| 
| 
| 
| 
| 
| 
|-
| 40
| 19 January (DH 1)
| @ 
| –
| 
| 
| 
| 
| 
| 
|-
| 41
| 19 January (DH 1)
| @ 
| –
| 
| 
| 
| 
| 
| 
|-
| 42
| 20 January
| @ 
| –
| 
| 
| 
| 
| 
| 
|-
| 43
| 24 January
| 
| –
| 
| 
| 
| 
| 
| 
|-
| 44
| 25 January
| 
| –
| 
| 
| 
| 
| 
| 
|-
| 45
| 26 January
| 
| –
| 
| 
| 
| 
| 
| 
|-
| 46
| 27 January
| 
| –
| 
| 
| 
| 
| 
| 
|-

Roster

References 

Perth Heat
Perth Heat